The 1880 Wimbledon Championships took place on the outdoor grass courts at the All England Lawn Tennis and Croquet Club in Wimbledon, London, United Kingdom. The tournament ran from 5 July until 15 July. It was the 4th staging of the Wimbledon Championships, and the first Grand Slam tennis event of 1880. There were a total of 60 competitors who entered the tournament a record until the 1904 draw. The admission charge remained at a shilling for the first four days, then raised to half a crown for the latter half of the draw. The final was watched by 1300 spectators.

Changes to the rules made a service touching the net, but otherwise good, a 'let'; while a player touching the net, or volleying before the ball crossed the net, lost the point.  Scoreboards were provided for the first time.

Gentlemen's singles

Final

 John Hartley defeated  Herbert Lawford, 6–3, 6–2, 2–6, 6–3 
This was Hartley's second and last Major.

All Comers' Final
 Herbert Lawford defeated  Otway Woodhouse, 7–5, 6–4, 6–0

References

 
Wimbledon Championship
Wimbledon Championship
Wimbledon Championship
July 1880 sports events